Gwawer District is a district (bakhsh) in Gilan-e Gharb County, Kermanshah Province, Iran. At the 2006 census, its population was 19,023, in 3,993 families.  The District has one city: Sarmast. The District has two rural districts (dehestan): Gowavar Rural District and Heydariyeh Rural District.

See also
Ghalajeh tunnel
Eywan County

References 

Gilan-e Gharb County

Districts of Kermanshah Province